Contra Tiempo is the sixth studio album released by Filipino alternative rock band Sandwich in 2011. The album contains the singles "Putik", which is inspired by Typhoon Ondoy (international name: Ketsana) and its effects, and "Lakad". The album name, which roughly translates to against the beat, comes from a line in the song "Sulputin". This is their first album with no English songs. There was an error in printing, listing "Dispalinghado" as track number 4 instead of "Stranded".

Track listing

Personnel
Raymund Marasigan - Vocals, guitars, harmonica, melodica, keyboards
Mong Alcaraz - guitars, vocals
Diego Castillo - guitars, vocals
Myrene Academia - bass, vocals
Mike Dizon - Drums, Vocals

Album Credits
Arranged & Performed by:Sandwich
Recorded by: Shinji Tanaka & Hazel Pascua
Mixed and Mastered by: Shinji Tanaka at Sound Creation Studios
Additional Back Up Vocals: Buddy Zabala, Atari Academia, Shouzan Tanaka
Tambourine by: Robert Javier
Catering by: Acel

Reference

2010 albums
Sandwich (band) albums
Tagalog-language albums
PolyEast Records albums